The following Confederate Army units and commanders fought in the Mobile campaign of the American Civil War including the battles of Spanish Fort and Fort Blakeley. The Union order of battle is shown separately.

Military rank
 MG = Major General
 BG = Brigadier General
 Col = Colonel
 Ltc = Lieutenant Colonel
 Maj = Major
 Cpt = Captain
 Lt = Lieutenant

District of the Gulf
MG Dabney H. Maury

Artillery reserves

Sources
 War of the Rebellion: Official Records of the Union and Confederate Armies, Series I, Volume 49, part 1.

American Civil War orders of battle
Mobile campaign (1865)